2nd Boston Society of Film Critics Awards
January 29, 1982

Best Film: 
 Pixote 
The 2nd Boston Society of Film Critics Awards honored the best filmmaking of 1981. The awards were given on 29 January 1982.

Winners
Best Film:
Pixote (Pixote: a Lei do Mais Fraco)
Best Actor:
Burt Lancaster – Atlantic City
Best Actress:
Marília Pêra – Pixote (Pixote: a Lei do Mais Fraco)
Best Supporting Actor:
Jack Nicholson – Reds
Best Supporting Actress:
Mona Washbourne – Stevie
Best Director:
Steven Spielberg – Raiders of the Lost Ark
Best Screenplay:
Andre Gregory and Wallace Shawn – My Dinner with Andre
Best Cinematography:
Gordon Willis – Pennies from Heaven
Best Documentary:
Diaries 
Best Foreign-Language Film (tie):
Beau Pere (Beau-père) • France
Taxi zum Klo • West Germany
Best Independent Film:
Gal Young 'Un 
Best American Film:
My Dinner with Andre

External links
Past Winners

References 
1981 Boston Society of Film Critics Awards Internet Movie Database

1981
1981 film awards
Boston
Boston
January 1982 events in the United States